George Ingle Finch  (4 August 1888 – 22 November 1970) was an Australian chemist and mountaineer. His obituary in The Times describes him as "one of the two best alpinists of his time" (with George Mallory).

Education and military service
He was born in Orange, New South Wales, Australia to Charles Edward and Laura Isabel (née Black) Finch, educated in German-speaking Switzerland, and studied physical sciences at the University of Geneva. He began studying medicine in Paris (where he scaled the walls of Notre Dame with his brother) but decided he preferred the physical sciences.

During the First World War, he served with the Royal Army Ordnance Corps. He was appointed a Member of the Order of the British Empire in the 1918 New Year Honours for services in connection with the War in France, Egypt and Salonika. In the Second World War he investigated fire defence.

Career
Finch fell out with the Everest Committee after 1922, but his pioneering work on oxygen, which he pursued with messianic zeal, remained crucial to future expeditions. In the Alps, Finch was on the first ascent of the North Face Diagonal or "Finch Route" on the Dent d'Hérens, which he climbed with T. G. B. Forster and R. Peto on 2 August 1923. Finch was also a keen skier and was a founding member of the Alpine Ski Club in 1908. He was a lifelong advocate and supporter of the Alpine Club and would later become its president.

Between 1936 and 1952, Finch held the position of Professor of Applied Physical Chemistry at Imperial College London.

He was elected a Fellow of the Royal Society in 1938. His candidacy citation read: 

Finch was awarded their Hughes Medal in 1944.  He was president of the Physical Society from 1947 to 1949.

Personal life
Finch was first married to Alicia "Betty" Fisher of London. By the time he returned from the front in 1917, Fisher had given birth to a son from a relationship with another man, Wentworth "Jock" Campbell, an Indian Army officer. That boy was the future Oscar-winning film actor Peter Finch.

George separated the infant from his mother and had his relatives raise him as his own son, even though he was not the biological father. Peter did not see his parents again until he returned to Britain and found fame in his thirties.  He remained close to his mother and met both George Finch and his biological father briefly.

George divorced Betty when Peter was two years old and married Gladys May, a nurse, after she became pregnant with their son Bryan. George left Gladys and the boy soon after the birth, but supported Bryan financially.

On 27 December 1921, George married Agnes Johnston, whom he called "Bubbles". The marriage lasted and they had three daughters: Joyce Nanette in 1923 (known as "Bunty"), Paola Jean in 1924 and Felice George (known as "Colette") in 1929.

References

External links 
 
 

1888 births
1970 deaths
Fellows of the Royal Society
Australian mountain climbers
Presidents of the Alpine Club (UK)
20th-century explorers
Presidents of the Physical Society
Members of the Order of the British Empire
20th-century British chemists
English chemists
Australian emigrants to England
British mountain climbers
British Army personnel of World War I
Royal Army Ordnance Corps soldiers
Military personnel from New South Wales